NSCL may stand for:
 National Superconducting Cyclotron Laboratory
 National Senior Classical League
 North Somerset Cricket League